The Colonial Exhibition, Dutch: Koloniale Tentoonstelling, took place in Semarang, Dutch East Indies (now Indonesia) in from 20 August through 22 November 1914. Colonial exhibitions were trade expositions. It was designed to "give a comprehensive picture of the Dutch Indies in their present prosperous condition." It was the first large scale exposition in the Dutch East Indies, and financed by the participating corporations with a subsidy from the Dutch East Indies government.

The architect was Maclaine Pont.

Exhibits
There were displays including companies, foreign states and areas within the Dutch East Indies. One area of the grounds had pavilions dedicated to cocoa, coffee, kapok, and tea.

Dutch East Indies
There was a Balinese, an Aceh pavilion central Java, and Semerang pavilions.

Foreign states
There were pavilions from Australia, China, Formosa (Taiwan) and Japan.

Companies
There were pavilions from several companies including 
German hardware manufacturing business Carl Schlieper,
the Netherland Indies Gas Company (NIGM), 
Nestlé,
and 
the Dutch shipping company Koninklijke Paketvaart-Maatschappij (KPM).

Legacy
The Aceh state pavilion was built in Acehnese style, without nails.

After the exposition, it was dismounted and re-erected as the Aceh Museum, where it and the Cakra Donya Bell also displayed remain.

Gallery

References

External links
 Colonial Exhibition of Semarang catalog University of Leiden Library
 Colonial Exhibition in Semarang 1914 Video including several contemporaneous photographs.

1914 establishments in Asia
Colonial exhibitions
Dutch East Indies society
Buildings and structures in Semarang
Festivals established in 1914
World's fairs in Asia